Bagthorpe is a village in Nottinghamshire, England. It is in the civil parish of Selston.

External links

Villages in Nottinghamshire
Ashfield District